Jacques Claude Demogeot (5 July 18081894) was a French man of letters.

Biography
Demogeot was born in Paris. He was professor of rhetoric at the Lycée Saint-Louis, and subsequently assistant professor at the Sorbonne. He wrote many detached papers on various literary subjects, and two reports on secondary education in England and Scotland in collaboration with H. Montucci. His reputation rests on his  (1851), which has passed through many subsequent editions. He died in Paris in 1894.

References

1808 births
1894 deaths
Academic staff of the University of Paris
French essayists
French male essayists